"Dangerous" is the debut single by American electronic music project Big Data, from their debut EP 1.0 (2013) and their debut studio album 2.0 (2015). It features American indie rock band Joywave, with vocals by the band's lead singer Daniel Armbruster.

Release
In August 2013, Big Data released an interactive video entitled "Facehawk", which, if given permission, connects to the viewer's Facebook profile and turns their timeline into a video. The video starts by displaying the viewer's Facebook home page and making it appear to update its status, then launches into a more abstract visual experience where pictures and status updates assemble to form a hawk. The project was created in collaboration with interactive artist and director Rajeev "Jeeves" Basu. According to the band, the video serves as a visual reminder for the audience about how much information they have shared on their Facebook profile, and how far back that information reaches. Big Data producer Alan Wilkis was an early adopter of Facebook, having created the 4,132nd account on the site while studying at Harvard University.

"Dangerous" was first released as a digital single by Big Data member Alan Wilkis' label Wilcassettes LLC on October 1, 2013. An EP entitled 1.5, consisting of eight remixes of "Dangerous", was released on December 3, 2013. The single was subsequently re-released on June 3, 2014. In April 2016, the Austrian rapper Left Boy used a sample of the song in his song of the same title; "Dangerous".
It was featured in the film Earth to Echo.

Music video
The music video for "Dangerous" was released on February 19, 2014 and directed by Brandon LaGanke and John Carlucci of GHOST+COW, based on a concept developed with Alan Wilkis. It revolves around two shoe designers who develop an athletic shoe that encourages the wearer to commit acts of violence. The two designers first observe a group of shackled inmates wearing the shoes and walking in circles until one wearer bumps into another, resulting in one inmate violently headbutting another, to the point that blood splatters onto the testers. Satisfied with the results, a marketing meeting is held to develop advertising for the shoe.

The rest of the video alternates between the pitching of advertising ideas and the concepts being shown in real time. The advertisement within the video opens with a woman (Lauren Francesca) in a two-piece running outfit jogging down a street, who is later joined by a second woman (Nicola Fiore) also jogging and similarly dressed. The camera frequently pans from the shoes to their breasts and faces, and closed captioning reading "sexual breathing". Seeing the chief marketing director's bored reaction, the designers begin to incorporate more graphic ideas into the advertisement, including the joggers headbutting various bystanders to death and engaging in a lesbian kiss, to the approval of the director and his executives, who toast champagne to celebrate their success.

Big Kitty version
On December 31, 2014 private messaging app Wickr sponsored a version of the music video, titled "Big Kitty", promoting its recent Facebook photo development to keep pictures private by using pictures of cats instead.

Charts

Weekly charts

Year-end charts

Certifications

Release history

References

2013 songs
2013 debut singles
Big Data (band) songs
Warner Records singles